The fifth competition weekend of the 2009–10 ISU Speed Skating World Cup was held at the Utah Olympic Oval, Salt Lake City, United States, from Friday, December 11, until Sunday, December 13, 2009.

World records were set by American Shani Davis on the men's 1500 metres, and by Germany's Jenny Wolf on the women's 500 metres.

Schedule of events
The schedule of the event is below.

Medal summary

Men's events

Women's events

References

Results

5
Isu World Cup, 2009-10, 5
Sports in Salt Lake City
ISU Speed Skating